Kim Hwan-Ee (Hangul: 김환이, born June 6, 1990) is a South Korean short track speed skater.

At the 2011 Winter Universiade, Kim won the gold medal in the men's 1500 metre events.

References

South Korean male short track speed skaters
Universiade medalists in short track speed skating
1990 births
Living people
Sportspeople from Daegu
Universiade gold medalists for South Korea
Competitors at the 2011 Winter Universiade
21st-century South Korean people